Road Trips Full Show: Spectrum 11/5/79 is a live album by the rock band the Grateful Dead.  It contains the complete concert that they performed at the Spectrum, in Philadelphia, Pennsylvania, on November 5, 1979.  It was released by Grateful Dead Records in 2008 as a digital download, in both MP3 and FLAC formats.

Road Trips Full Show: Spectrum 11/5/79 is a continuation of the Digital Downloads series of Grateful Dead albums, and is also a spin-off of the Road Trips series.  It was released several months after Road Trips Volume 1 Number 1, and features a show from the concert tour that was excerpted for that album.  It was issued concurrently with a digital download album recorded the following evening, Road Trips Full Show: Spectrum 11/6/79.

Track listing
Disc one
First set:
 "China Cat Sunflower" > (Garcia, Hunter)
 "I Know You Rider" (traditional)
 "Cassidy" (Weir, Barlow)
 "Friend of the Devil" (Garcia, Dawson, Hunter)
 "El Paso" (Marty Robbins)
 "Stagger Lee" (Garcia, Hunter)
 "Passenger" (Lesh, Monk)
 "Peggy-O" (traditional)
 "The Music Never Stopped" (Weir, Barlow)
Disc two
Second set:
 "Althea" (Garcia, Hunter)
 "Easy to Love You" (Mydland, Barlow)
 "Eyes of the World" > (Garcia, Hunter)
 "Estimated Prophet" > (Weir, Barlow)
 "Franklin's Tower" > (Garcia, Kreutzmann, Hunter)
Disc three
 "Jam" > (Grateful Dead)
 "Drums" > (Grateful Dead)
 "Space" > (Grateful Dead)
 "Lost Sailor" > (Weir, Barlow)
 "Saint of Circumstance" > (Weir, Barlow)
 "Sugar Magnolia" (Weir, Hunter)
Encore:
"Casey Jones" (Garcia, Hunter)

Personnel
Jerry Garcia – lead guitar, vocals
Mickey Hart – drums
Bill Kreutzmann – drums
Phil Lesh – electric bass
Brent Mydland – keyboards, vocals
Bob Weir – rhythm guitar, vocals

References

Grateful Dead Download Series
Road Trips albums
2008 live albums